The year 1912 in archaeology involved some significant events.

Explorations

Excavations
 Project to excavate and restore ancient temples at Sanchi begins under Sir John Marshall (continues to 1919).
 Excavations at Viroconium (Wroxeter) in England begin (continue to 1914).
 Excavations at Uruk by Deutsche Orient-Gesellschaft begin (continue to 1913).
 Excavations at St. Mary's Abbey, York by Walter Harvey-Brook

Finds
 June - Cheapside Hoard of early 17th century jewellery from the City of London.
 June 23 - Jaw of "Piltdown Man" "found" by Charles Dawson in Sussex, England (shown to be a hoax in 1953).
 December 6 - Bust of Nefertiti from Tell el-Amarna, Egypt by a German archeological team.

Publications
 Aleš Hrdlička - Early Man in South America.

Births
January 8: Sigurður Þórarinsson, Icelandic pioneer of tephrochronology (d. 1983)
June 8: Don Crabtree, American experimental archaeologist (d. 1980)
August 5: Margaret Guido, born Cecily Margaret Preston, English archaeologist (d. 1994)
 Elisabeth Schmid, German archaeologist and osteologist (d. 1994)

Deaths

References

Archaeology
Archaeology
Archaeology by year